Indo-Russia Rifles Private Limited (IRRPL) is a rifle-manufacturing facility in Korwa, Amethi district in the Indian state of Uttar Pradesh. The factory will manufacture the AK-200 variant of the Kalashnikov family of rifles. The factory is a joint-venture of the Ordnance Factory Board of India and Kalashnikov Concern of Russia, with Rosoboronexport holding a minority stake and will produce 750,000 AK-203, a 7.62×39mm variant from the AK-100 family.

Ownership
The factory is a joint venture between three companies. The Ordnance Factory Board (OFB) owns the controlling stakes of 50.5% while Kalashnikov owns 42% stake followed by 7.5% stake owned by Rosonboronexport. An Indian CEO from the Indian Army leads the company. The Army has appointed Major General Sanjeev Sengar as the Chief Executive Officer.

Background 
Since the late 1950s, the Indian armed forces had been equipped with a locally produced licensed copy of the L1A1 self-loading rifles. In mid-1980s, the decision was taken to develop a 5.56×45mm NATO calibre rifle to replace the obsolete rifles. Trials on various prototypes based on the AKM were carried out by the Armament Research and Development Establishment (ARDE) in Pune. On the completion of the trial, The Indian Small Arms System (INSAS) was adopted in 1990, becoming the standard issue assault rifle of the Indian infantry. However, to phase out  the still in use bolt-action Lee–Enfield rifles as quickly as possible, India had to acquire 100,000 7.62×39mm AKM-type rifles from Russia, Hungary, Romania and Israel in 1990–92. 

The INSAS was initially built with features borrowed from several different rifles and was not made to meet the specific requirements of the Indian security forces. In recent years the rifle has come under increasing scrutiny, with several issues, surfacing from frontline forces that have inhibited operational capabilities. For example, the plastic magazine of the rifle has repeatedly cracked under cold weather conditions and has reportedly even overheated during long battles leading to malfunctions, making it an unreliable choice for a standard issue rifle. It has been observed that militants in Kashmir are drugged which leads to them being capable of taking a 5.56×45mm bullet and still being able to fight. Thats why the army is now using AK variants in Kashmir. Due to these repeated downfalls, In April 2015, the Indian government even had to replace some INSAS rifles of the CRPF with AKM variants to ensure greater success in the CRPF's fight against Naxalites. Therefore, owing to these failures and the changing needs of the armed forces, it was announced in early 2017 that the INSAS rifles would be retired and replaced by a weapon capable of firing the larger 7.62×51mm NATO cartridges.

As part of the replacement process, the new Kalashnikov rifle was to be made in a joint venture production facility located in Amethi, Uttar Pradesh. The factory manufactures the AK-203 variant of the Kalashnikov family of rifles, which along with the SIG716, manufactured by United States-based SIG Sauer will replace the INSAS rifles as well as the AK-47s. The first batch of 10,000 SIG Sauer rifles were delivered in December 2019.

Product
The IRRPL has been licensed to produce 750,000 AK-203 assault rifles chambered for 7.62×39mm. The AK-203 is a modernized 200 series AK-103 variant and one of the modern derivatives of the Russian AK-Pattern series of assault rifles. The 200 series are technically based on the AK-100 family and the more expensive AK-12 rifle family. The AK-203 is reported as the newest version of the AK-47 assault rifle.

During the Defence Expo 2020 in Lucknow, Major General Sengar announced that the IRRPL facility in Amethi would produce 75,000 AK-203 annually for 10 years.

It was announced that 670,000 AK-203 rifles will be produced for the Indian military. Production of the AK-203 started on January 2023.

References

External links
Demonstration of Kalashnikov AK 203 by Kalashnikov Concern. 

India–Russia relations
Firearm manufacturers of India
Defence companies of India
Manufacturing plants in Uttar Pradesh
Indian companies established in 2019
Joint ventures
2019 establishments in Uttar Pradesh
Manufacturing companies established in 2019